The Cleopatra World Tour was the second concert tour by American folk rock band The Lumineers, in support of their second studio album, Cleopatra (2016). The tour began in Bristol on April 14, 2016, and concluded on December 10, 2017, in Inglewood.

Set list 
This set list is from the concert on June 7, 2016 in Morrison, Colorado. It is not intended to represent all shows from the tour.

 "Sleep on the Floor"
 "Ophelia"
 "Flowers in Your Hair"
 "Classy Girls"
 "Cleopatra"
 "Dead Sea"
 "Charlie Boy"
 "Where the Skies Are Blue"
 "Ain't Nobody's Problem"
 "Subterranean Homesick Blues" 
 "Slow It Down"
 "Gun Song" 
 "Ho Hey"
 "Angela"
 "Big Parade"
 "My Eyes"
 "Patience"
Encore
 "Long Way From Home" 
 "Submarines"
 "In the Light"
 "Stubborn Love"

Opening acts 
Several opening acts appeared throughout the tour, including Langhorne Slim & The Law, Rayland Baxter, BØRNS, No Lawn Chairs, SOAK. Andrew Bird, Kaleo, Margaret Glapsy, Susto were opened for their 2017 legs on select stops.

Tour dates
The first round tour schedule was announced for 32 stops,. Some stops for 2016 were announced, as was the band's first arena tour in 2017.

On February 27, 2017, the band announced that the tour was scheduled to end at their hometown Denver, Colorado with three shows at Fiddler's Green Amphitheatre in Greenwood Village. However, they continued to play more several shows. The band was invited by President Barack Obama to perform for South By South Lawn on October 3. Band members Wesley Schultz and Jeremiah Fraites played on a tribute concert Tower of Song: A Memorial Tribute to Leonard Cohen on November 6 at Bell Center in Montreal.

The Lumineers also was the opening act for U2 for their 2017 the Joshua Tree Tour, and Tom Petty and the Heartbreakers from May to August in 2017 on select shows.

Notes

References 

The Lumineers
2016 concert tours